Papal arms may refer to:
 Coat of arms of the Holy See (the coat of arms of the papacy)
 Papal coats of arms (personal coats of arms of individual popes)